Jalaun Solar Power Project is a solar photo-voltaic power generating station spanning two villages of Kuhana and Shajahanpur in Jalaun district of Uttar Pradesh. The plant has been developed by Essel Infraprojects Limited, an arm of Essel Group. The plant is spread on a 250-acre land and is expected to generate 85 million units per year and connected to 132 KV Sarsela-Kalpi substations.

The plant was inaugurated by U.P. chief minister Akhilesh Yadav on 27 January 2016 under the Uttar Pradesh Solar Power Policy 2013. A Power Purchase Agreement (PPA) between U.P. Government and Essel Infraprojects Limited has been signed which is valid for 25 years.

See also 

 Solar power in India
 Renewable energy in India

References

Solar power stations in Uttar Pradesh
Jalaun district
Energy infrastructure completed in 2016
2016 establishments in Uttar Pradesh